Leigh is a village and civil parish (with a parish council shared with Bransford) in the Malvern Hills district of the county of Worcestershire, England.

With just a few hundred inhabitants the parish lies on the A4103, the main Worcester to Hereford road, about 5 miles out of Worcester, whilst Malvern is also about 5 miles away. The parish includes Leigh, Brockamin, Leigh Sinton, Sandlin & Smith End Green. The local pronunciation is that the name rhymes with "lie".

Due largely to the significant reduction of the hop industry in the area, Leigh, like many local villages, declined in the late 20th century; it lost its pub, its police station and its railway station (with the closure of the Bromyard branch line in the 1960s).

History

Leigh's Norman church (St. Edburga's) was built in 1100 by Benedictine monks from Pershore Abbey. It is listed by English heritage as a Grade I listed building.

Leigh Court Barn is the largest and one of the oldest cruck framed barns in Britain.

A mile to the south at Castle Green are the earthwork and buried remains of a medieval motte and bailey castle.

Enclosures of common lands caused riots at Leigh in 1778, where  anti-enclosure rioters attacked the physical enclosure:

Following the Poor Law Amendment Act 1834 Leigh Parish ceased to be responsible for maintaining the poor in its parish. This responsibility was transferred to Martley Poor Law Union.

The area is reputedly haunted by the ghost of a robber named Edmund Colles, who is said to appear in a coach drawn by four fire-breathing horses.

References

External links

 Leigh & Bransford parish web site
 St. Edburga's Church history
 Church porch sketch

Villages in Worcestershire
Civil parishes in Worcestershire